Herve may refer to:

Herve, a Walloon municipality of Belgium in province of Liege.
Herve cheese
Land of Herve, a natural region

Herve Yaméogo (born 1982), Burkinabé basketball player